Trivelli is a surname. Notable people with the surname include:

Paul A. Trivelli (born 1953), American diplomat
Renzo Trivelli (1925–2015), Italian politician